The Energy Efficiency and Conservation Act is an Act of Parliament in New Zealand. It is administered by the Ministry for the Environment.

The Act established the Energy Efficiency and Conservation Authority.

The Act requires the Energy Efficiency and Conservation Authority to prepare a national energy efficiency and conservation strategy for approval by the administering Minister.

The minister is required to have a national energy efficiency and conservation strategy in force at all times.

See also
Energy in New Zealand

References

External links
Text of the Act

Statutes of New Zealand
Energy in New Zealand
2000 in New Zealand law
Nature conservation in New Zealand
Energy law
Energy efficiency